Elisabeth Anderson Sierra is an Oregon-based mother also known as "the milk goddess". She has hyperlactation syndrome.

In 2014, she was diagnosed with hyperlactation syndrome. Due to this syndrome she was producing much larger quantities of breastmilk and she didn't want this to go to waste. That's why she decided to help other mothers.

References 

Breast diseases
Breastfeeding
Pathology of pregnancy, childbirth and the puerperium
People from Beaverton, Oregon
Year of birth missing (living people)
Living people